Rhene konradi is a jumping spider species in the genus Rhene.  It was first described by Wanda Wesołowska in 2009 and lives in South Africa.

References

Endemic fauna of South Africa
Salticidae
Spiders of South Africa
Spiders described in 2009
Taxa named by Wanda Wesołowska